The Ogooué-Lolo Province is one of the nine provinces of Gabon, slightly southeast of central Gabon. The regional capital is Koulamoutou, a city of approximately 16,000 people. It is the ninth largest city in Gabon and the home of slightly more than one-third of the provincial population.
 Area: 25,380 km²
 2-letter abbreviation/HASC: GA-OL
 ISO 3166-2: GA-07
 Population (2013): 65,771

Its length runs from the 3 S to 2 N and from 10 E to 11 E.

To the south, Ogooué-Lolo borders the Niari Region of the Republic of the Congo. Domestically, it borders the following provinces:
 Ngounié – west-southwest
 Moyen-Ogooué – northwest, at a quadripoint
 Ogooué-Ivindo – north and northwest
Haut-Ogooué – east

Departments

Ogooué-Lolo is divided into 4 departments:
 Lolo-Bouenguidi Department (Koulamoutou)
 Lombo-Bouenguidi Department (Pana)
 Mouloundou Department (Lastoursville)
 Offoué-Onoye Department (Iboundji)

Historical population

The population from 1981 to 1991 lost slightly more than one tenth of the total 1981 population. The population loss was slower than other provinces in Gabon.

Places

References

 
Provinces of Gabon